is a collection of interconnected short stories by Yōko Ogawa. It was published in Japan in 1998, and in the United States by Picador in 2013. Stephen Snyder translated the book into English.

Stories

"Afternoon at the Bakery" 
A narrator of unknown gender (though it is heavily implied that they are female) visits a bakery on their son's birthday. When they arrive, no one is at the counter, and they sit down to wait. While waiting, an elderly woman comes in and sits next to them, and after some conversation, the narrator reveals that their son is dead. As they sit meditating on the day they found their son--who died of suffocation after crawling into a refrigerator--and the aftermath of his death, they notice a young woman in the back of the shop, weeping. Rather than intervene, they watch the woman cry and wait for her to come out. The story ends with the narrator repeating to themselves what they plan to say when the young woman comes out: “Two strawberry shortcakes, please.”

"Fruit Juice" 
The narrator, whose gender remains ambiguous throughout the story, is approached by a girl in their university library, where she asks them to lunch on the coming Saturday. Though the invitation comes as a surprise, they accept, and the girl is visibly relieved. On Saturday, when they meet, the girl reveals that her mother is dying has instructed her to contact a man who she has never met, who we are made to understand is her father. They sit down in an upscale French restaurant, where the girl's father orders an ostentatious amount of expensive food, making no mention of her mother or the financial struggles they've faced in the years that he has refrained from contacting them. The narrator does little to contribute to the conversation and watches them interact stiltedly until dessert arrives. The girl's father offers to give them a ride home, but she refuses, notably also refusing to take the subway back to their neighborhood. On their walk, during which the girl is incredibly exhausted, she expresses gratitude for the narrator's presence during the meeting, and tells the narrator about her mother, who is a musician-turned-typist with beautiful, elegant hands. They take a break on a bench and the narrator remarks on the girl's own hands, which are like her mothers. They are sitting in front of a closed post-office that has been there since they were children and, curious, the girl decides to take a look inside. She and the narrator peer through a crack in the door to see a mountain of kiwis. Violently, the girl breaks the lock on the door, and once inside, gorges herself on kiwis. The narrator remarks that the girl left university soon afterwards to pursue culinary school. They never saw each other again, but the narrator called her five years afterwards at her place of work--a bakery--to apologize for not being much help during the lunch with her father, causing her to weep and thank him again for being there.

"Old Mrs. J" 
A woman moves into an apartment next to a large kiwi orchard. She lives across the courtyard from her elderly landlady, Mrs. J, who owns the orchard and cultivates a large garden in the complex and distributes produce to her favorite tenants. The narrator finds herself watching Mrs. J often, becoming familiar with her daily routine. After the narrator tells Mrs. J that the best way to keep the cats away from her produce beds is to spread pine needles around them, Mrs. J brings her fresh produce and comes over for tea frequently, often remarking that the narrator seems tense and that she would gladly offer her a massage for free. When the narrator asks Mrs. J where her husband is, Mrs. J states that he was a drunk who gambled away all the money she made from rent and didn't work and that one night he disappeared, presumably falling drunkenly into the sea. One night, as the narrator is up late working on a manuscript, she sees Mrs. J on top of a middle aged man on her bed. She remarks that it appears Mrs. J is strangling him, though she is just giving him a massage. Another night, she sees Mrs. J running across the kiwi orchard, carrying a large box entirely full of kiwis away at a full sprint. Soon afterwards, Mrs. J begins to dig up carrots that look like pudgy human hands. She gives the first to the narrator, but as they become more plentiful, begins to distribute them amongst her tenants. This brings the attention to the local press, and Mrs. J is photographed with the narrator and a few other tenants holding the oddly shaped carrots. After what seems like some time, the narrator is interviewed by the police, who ask her if she knew what had happened to Mrs. J's husband, or if she had seen anything strange. The narrator repeats what her landlady told her about her husband and tells them about the incident with the kiwis. The police search an abandoned post office nearby and find a large number of kiwis and the corpse of a cat, but nothing else. It's only when they bulldoze the garden that they find the body of Mrs. J's husband, whose hands are missing.

"The Little Dustman" 
A man travels on a train to the funeral of a woman he refers to as "Mama," which is what he called his father's second wife, a writer. The narrator lost his mother when he was very young after she picked at a pimple inside of her nose and died of sepsis when it became infected. Mama was a noticeably diminutive woman who was only 14 years older than the narrator when she married his father. Though only in his life for two years, the narrator was deeply affected by Mama's presence in his life. She was a writer, but instructed him to never tell his father this fact, and loved to share her stories with him. The narrator describes walking in on her talking to herself often, though he never understood what she was saying. The bulk of the story is taken up by his remembering a particular trip to the zoo where Mama remarked on the absurdity of giraffes' long necks. He vividly remembers getting mediocre ice cream and doing his best to look like he was enjoying himself to make her feel better. After the funeral, he is given a box of her belongings, and it includes a picture of Mama with a thin old woman, both of them holding carrots shaped like human hands.

"Lab Coats" 
Two women work as secretaries in a large hospital. As part of their duties, they count and sort dirty lab coats and place them in the laundry. The narrator is very attracted to the woman she's working with, to the point of ignoring rather large faults in her personality, such as her tendency to talk only about herself, her blaming a mistake in a presentation for a doctor on the narrator, and the fact that her boyfriend is a married doctor with children. One night, while they are sorting the coats, the beautiful woman is distracted and cannot stop talking about her boyfriend. She relays that her boyfriend had taken a train to see his in-laws a few nights before, ostensibly to tell them about his pending divorce (which he still hasn't told his wife, who has just given birth, about). He was supposed to see her afterwards and tell her how it went. Over the course of the conversation, the woman completely abandons the task and focuses solely on what happened when her boyfriend came over, late, and told her that he felt an invisible force was holding him back from telling them and he hadn't even made it there. She states he is always full of excuses, when it comes to telling his wife, why he is late, or whenever he breaks off plans. Finally, she reveals that the night before, overcome with hurt, frustration, and rage, she killed him. The narrator comes across his lab coat, and as she takes note of it and shakes it, a tongue falls out of the pocket.

"Sewing for the Heart" 
The narrator walks into a hospital, where the a doctor is being called repeatedly over the intercom to report to illustration. When the narrator asks a secretary why they are calling him, they state they have not seen him all day. The narrator then makes his way to the cardiac ward, and we begin to travel backwards to how he got to this point. The narrator is a bagmaker, and is known for being able to make or repair any kind of bag. He is very proud of the purpose of bags, and is fascinated by them--his nightly routine includes watching people walk past on the street , observing the bags they carry. One day, a pretty woman comes into his shop and tells him that she needs him to make a bag that can hold a human heart. The woman reveals that she was born with her heart outside of her body and she is seeking a bag to protect and hold it. The bagmaker is disgusted but curious about what it will look like to see a human heart outside of the body, and agrees. They agree that seal skin is the best material, she leaves, and he gets to work. Once he has a prototype sketched for the bag, he leads her up to his apartment to take measurements in private. She takes off her blouse, and while he remarks on the shapeliness of her body, he is transfixed by her heart, which is fully visible and connected to her by large visible veins and ventricles. As he takes measurements, his fingers brush the heart and he remarks on how warm it is. He becomes obsessed with it, and the bag that will hold it. Over an indeterminable period of time, he neglects his other duties, including regular clients and his pet hamster, whose corpse he disposes of in a trashcan outside a fast food restaurant, to work on the bag. He is obsessed with the idea of making something that no one else could make. Once he has a prototype for the bag, he goes to the club where she works, and watches her sing, obsessing over every movement and every measure she takes to conceal her heart. Soon afterwards, she comes back to his apartment for a fitting, and while there are a couple adjustments that need to be made, he is overwhelmingly pleased with his work, and so is she. However, after he has made these adjustments, she tells him that she has found a heart surgeon who has devised a new method to place her heart inside of her body, and while she will pay him for the bag, she will no longer be needing it. The narrator is distressed by this, the idea of her not wearing it, of the heart not being inside the bag he made unbearable. Now back in the elevator, the narrator reveals he is there to convince the woman to try on the bag, so that once it is inside he can cut her heart away from her body and take it with him.

"Welcome to the Museum of Torture" 

A woman who lives in the same building where the woman from apartment 508 use to live, gets dumped by her boyfriend when she tells him about what did that woman from apartment 508 did to her boyfriend “Dr Y”. Now the woman roams around the plaza next day where the bakery and fountain is, after walking a little further she finds a house and it is named “the museum of torture.” She felt an urge to go inside and explore so she goes in and finds no one. The house looked like someone rich lived in it. Suddenly a man comes in, pretty old but well built and dressed. He then asks her if she’s here to contribute an object of torture or to take the tour. She asks for a tour so the man takes her inside. They explore various torture items from 18th century and before. The woman is a hair dresser and when she is shown a torture object related to hair, she decides that she’ll take it and torture her boyfriend with it. She imagines it and feels really good. At the end of the tour, she asks the guide if she can come again, the guide answers that she’s welcome anytime, he’ll be expecting her to come soon.

 "The Man Who Sold Braces"
 "The Last Hour of the Bengal Tiger"
 "Tomatoes and the Full Moon"
 "Poison Plants"

Reception

The work won the  2014 Independent Foreign Fiction Prize shortlist.

Alan Cheuse of National Public Radio wrote that "this collection may linger in your mind — it does in mine — as a delicious, perplexing, absorbing and somehow singular experience."

Kirkus Reviews wrote that the story was "well-written" and that "although the stories may be perceived as gruesome, the author paints each tale exquisitely."

References

Further reading
 "Revenge." Three Percent, University of Rochester.
 Turkewitz, Rebecca (Ohio State University MFA candidate). "Review of Revenge: Eleven Dark Tales by Yoko Ogawa; translated by Stephen Snyder." The Journal, Ohio State University.
 Feng, Rhoda (Student, Wellesley College). "Review: Yoko Ogawa's Revenge." Huffington Post. May 7, 2013.
 "Briefly Noted Revenge by Yoko Ogawa, translated from the Japanese by Stephen Snyder (Picador)." The New Yorker. February 25, 2013.
 Tonkin, Boyd. "Revenge, By Yoko Ogawa." The Independent. Friday March 15, 2013.
 Shea, Colleen. "Revenge: Eleven Dark Tales." Open Letters Monthly.

External links
 Revenge: Eleven Dark Tales. 
Macmillan Company

1998 short story collections
Japanese short story collections
Horror short story collections
Short story collections by Yōko Ogawa